Pseudlithosia is a monotypic moth genus of the family Crambidae described by George Hampson in 1907. It contains only one species, Pseudlithosia schausi, described by the same author in the same year, which is found in Jalisco, Mexico.

References

Natural History Museum Lepidoptera genus database

Acentropinae
Monotypic moth genera
Moths of Central America
Crambidae genera
Taxa named by George Hampson